Mount Hastings is a low mountain  southeast of Mount Rigby in the Karo Hills, at the west side of Scott Glacier in Antarctica. It was first sighted by the Byrd Antarctic Expedition, 1928–30, and was named by the Advisory Committee on Antarctic Names for James V. Hastings, who carried out geomagnetic studies at McMurdo Station in the summer of 1964–65.

References

Mountains of the Ross Dependency
Amundsen Coast